Alchemy (published in 2004) is a novel for older children by the New Zealand author Margaret Mahy.

Plot summary

Roland, a 7th former who has been caught shoplifting, is given an unusual assignment: to spy on a mysterious girl in his class who is studying alchemy. Jess Ferret is an eccentric girl who likes playing with words. However, an enemy from the boy's past wants the girl's power and is using him for information. Roland eventually finds out that he is not unlike Jess and her abilities, but gets them both into a situation which endangers their lives.

Alchemy has similar themes to two other books by Mahy, The Changeover and The Haunting.

The book won the senior fiction section of the 2003 New Zealand Post Children's Book Awards.

References

2004 novels
New Zealand fantasy novels
Young adult fantasy novels
New Zealand children's books
Fiction about alchemy
HarperCollins books
2004 children's books
21st-century New Zealand novels
Books by Margaret Mahy